CSA Partners is a venture capital fund backed by Chris Abele, Milwaukee County Executive, and former president and CEO of the Argosy Foundation  Abele invested 10 million dollars into the fund. The firm leases 35,000 square feet at remodelled space inside the historic John Pritzlaff Hardware Company building.

CSA Partners hosts the monthly "1 Million Cups" start up showcase.

Investments
CSA's portfolio includes EatStreet, PrettyLitter, Spirit Shop, Scanalytics Inc. and Review Trackers.

See also
 Argosy Foundation
 BrightStar Wisconsin Foundation
 Gener8tor
 Ward 4 (Milwaukee, WI startup accelerator space)
 Wisconsin Economic Development Corporation
 Wisconsin Investment Partners
 Business incubator
 Seed accelerator
 Techstars
 Y Combinator (company)

References

External links

Organizations based in Milwaukee
Venture capital firms of the United States